The Guild S-100 electric guitar is a lightweight solid-body guitar made by the Guild Guitar Company.  It features two humbucking pickups and its body is styled similarly to a Gibson SG, but is slightly offset. In the 1970s, a version of this guitar was available from the factory with leaves and acorns carved in relief into the body of the guitar.

Players of the Guild S-100 have included Pete Cosey (on the 1975 Miles Davis album Agharta), Carrie Brownstein of Wild Flag and Sleater-Kinney, Tim Kinsella of Joan of Arc, Chris McCaughan of The Lawrence Arms, Kim Thayil of Soundgarden, Stephen Malkmus, Bobb Trimble, and Ian Hunter of Mott the Hoople.

References

Electric guitars